The 1999 NCAA Division I women's basketball tournament began on March 12, 1999, and concluded on March 28, 1999, when Purdue won its first national championship in any women's sport. The Final Four was held at the San Jose Arena in San Jose, California, on March 26–28, 1999. Purdue defeated Duke 62-45 in Carolyn Peck's final game as head coach for the Boilermakers.  She had previously announced her intention of leaving Purdue after two seasons to coach the expansion WNBA Orlando Miracle.

The two finalists had recent "off the court" history.  Duke's coach, Gail Goestenkors, was a former assistant coach at Purdue under Lin Dunn until becoming the Blue Devils' head coach in 1992.  Dunn's firing from Purdue in 1996 and the subsequent player defections resulted in the unusual scenario that two Blue Devil players in the championship game had formerly transferred from Purdue. Purdue's Ukari Figgs was named Most Outstanding Player.

Notable events
Tennessee, which had won the prior three national championships,  was selected as a 1 seed, and started out strongly, beating Appalachian State 113–54. They continued on easily through the second and third rounds, then faced Duke in the East regional final. Duke was the 3 seed, but had upset Old Dominion 76–63 to reach the regional final. Tennessee and Duke had met in the regular season, with the Lady Vols winning by 14. The game was played in North Carolina, but Tennessee fans outnumbered Duke fans. Tennessee's Chamique Holdsclaw, generally considered the top player in the college game, missed her first ten shots, and ended up with only eight points, her lowest point total of the year. Duke reached an eleven-point lead in the first half, but Tennessee started out the second half strong, hitting four baskets in a row, and cut the lead to four points. Duke went over five minutes without scoring a basket, but Tennessee could only cut the lead to a single point. Duke's Georgia Schweitzer tied her career high with 22 points, and the Blue Devils advanced to the Final Four for the first time in their history.

Connecticut was the 1 seed in the Mideast regional, and hosted the first two rounds at their home court, Gampel Pavilion. The Huskies won their first game easily, beating St. Francis (PA) by 51 points. The second game, against Xavier, would prove to be very different. Xavier led by as many as ten points in the second half, and with just over two minutes to play, the Musketeers had an eight-point lead, 84–76. UConn scored six consecutive points to tie the game at 84 points each. With 37 seconds left in the game Xavier's Nikki Kremer was fouled, and headed to the line, having hit all eight free throw attempts on the day. She missed both attempts. After Shea Ralph missed a jumper, Tamika Williams snared the rebound and was fouled. With seven seconds left in the game she hit both free throws. Xavier tried two desperation shots, but missed both, and UConn narrowly escaped an upset on their own court.

Georgia faced Duke in one of the national semi-finals. Georgia hit nine of their sixteen three point attempts, and held the Miller twins, who have been averaging 37 points per game, to only 31. Duke lead at halftime, then went on a 14–5 run the extend the lead.  Georgia later responded with a 13–4 run, but could not take, the lead. Duke went on to win the game 81–69 and advance to their first championship game.

Louisiana Tech returned to the Final Four, a year after reaching the championship game. However, Purdue came into the game riding a 30-game winning streak. Purdue's Ukari Figgs scored 18 points in the first half, leading to a 40–27 lead at halftime. The Lady Techsters fought back in the second half, and cut the lead to three points, but Purdue's Stephanie White-McCarty stole the ball for a score, and followed it with a shot-clock beating basket to extend the led back to seven points. Louisiana Tech would not get closer again, and the Boilermakers extended their winning streak to 31 games, and a place in the championship match with a 77–63 win.

Tournament records
 Steals in a first or second round game – Old Dominion, recorded 25 steals in an East region first-round game against Tennessee Tech, tying the record for most steals in any NCAA tournament game, set by Maryland against Stephen F. Austin in 1989, since the statistic was first recorded in 1988.
 Personal fouls – Missouri State committed 36 personal fouls in a West region second-round game against Colorado State, setting the record for most personal fouls committed in an NCAA tournament game.

Qualifying teams – automatic
Sixty-four teams were selected to participate in the 1999 NCAA Tournament. Thirty conferences were eligible for an automatic bid to the 1999 NCAA tournament.

Qualifying teams – at-large
Thirty-four additional teams were selected to complete the sixty-four invitations.

Bids by conference
Thirty conferences earned an automatic bid.  In seventeen cases, the automatic bid was the only representative from the conference. Thirty-four additional at-large teams were selected from thirteen of the conferences.

First and second rounds

In 1999, the field remained at 64 teams. The teams were seeded, and assigned to four geographic regions, with seeds 1-16 in each region. In Round 1, seeds 1 and 16 faced each other, as well as seeds 2 and 15, seeds 3 and 14, seeds 4 and 13, seeds 5 and 12, seeds 6 and 11, seeds 7 and 10, and seeds 8 and 9. In the first two rounds, the top four seeds were given the opportunity to host the first-round game. In all cases, the higher seed accepted the opportunity.

The following table lists the region, host school, venue and the sixteen first and second round locations:

Regionals and Final Four

The Regionals, named for the general location, were held from March 20 to March 22 at these sites:

 Midwest Regional  Redbird Arena, Normal, Illinois (Host: Illinois State University)
 West Regional  Los Angeles Memorial Sports Arena, Los Angeles (Host: University of Southern California)
 Mideast Regional  Shoemaker Center, Cincinnati (Host: University of Cincinnati)
 East Regional  Greensboro Coliseum Complex, Greensboro, North Carolina

Each regional winner advanced to the Final Four held March 26 and March 28 in San Jose, California at the San Jose Arena

Bids by state

The sixty-four teams came from thirty-one states. California had the most teams with six bids. Nineteen states did not have any teams receiving bids.

Brackets
Data source

East Region – Greensboro, North Carolina

Mideast Region – Cincinnati

Midwest Region – Normal, Illinois

West Region – Los Angeles

Final Four – San Jose, California

E-East; ME-Mideast; MW-Midwest; W-West.

Record by conference
Fourteen conferences had more than one bid, or at least one win in NCAA Tournament play:

Sixteen conferences went 0-1: Big Sky Conference, Big South Conference, Big West Conference, Ivy League, MAAC, MAC, Mid-Continent, MEAC, Midwestern Collegiate, Northeast Conference, Ohio Valley Conference, Patriot League, Southern Conference, Southland, SWAC, and Trans America

All-Tournament team

 Ukari Figgs, Purdue
 Stephanie White-McCarty, Purdue
 Katie Douglas, Purdue
 Michele VanGorp, Duke
 Nicole Erickson, Duke

Game officials

 Scott Yarbrough (semifinal)
 Kim Balque(semifinal)
 Dennis DeMayo (semifinal)
 Sally Bell (semifinal)
 Stan Gaxiola (semifinal)
 Lisa Mattingly (semifinal)
 Melissa Barlow (final)
 Bob Trammell (final)
 Teresa Dahlem  (final)

See also
 1999 NCAA Division I men's basketball tournament
 1999 NCAA Division II women's basketball tournament
 1999 NCAA Division III women's basketball tournament
 1999 NAIA Division I women's basketball tournament
 1999 NAIA Division II women's basketball tournament

Notes 

NCAA Division I women's basketball tournament
Basketball in Lubbock, Texas
 
NCAA Division I women's basketball tournament
Events in Lubbock, Texas
Sports competitions in Texas